Ironbark is a suburb of the regional city of Bendigo in north central Victoria, Australia,  north west of the Bendigo city centre. Ironbark was named after the Ironbark Valley. Ironbark was part of Long Gully until 1999 when it became a separate suburb. 

References

External links

Towns in Victoria (Australia)
Bendigo